Lee Kye-in (born May 16, 1952) is a South Korean actor. Among his notable television series are Chief Inspector (1972-1989), Country Diaries (1980-2002), Emperor Wang Gun (2000-2002), and Jumong (2006-2007).

Filmography

Film

Television series

Television show

Music video

Awards and nominations

References

External links 
 
 
 
 
 Lee Kye-in Fan Cafe at Daum 

1952 births
Living people
South Korean male television actors
South Korean male film actors
People from Incheon
20th-century South Korean male actors
21st-century South Korean male actors